William Peterson (by 1517 – 3 October 1578) was an English politician.

He was a Member (MP) of the Parliament of England for Lewes in 1558.

References

1578 deaths
English MPs 1558
Year of birth uncertain